Jacinto is a masculine given name. It may also refer to:

 Jacinto (surname)
 Jacinto, Minas Gerais, Brazil, a municipality
 Jacinto, California, United States, an unincorporated community
 Jacinto, Mississippi, United States, a census-designated place
 Jacinto, Nebraska, United States, an unincorporated community
 Jacinto-class patrol vessel, a Philippine Navy ship class